Simone del Pollaiolo (1457–1508) was a Florentine architect who was commonly known as Il Cronaca ("The Chronicle One").

Pollaiolo was born in Florence, the nephew of the better-known brothers Antonio and Piero Benci who had the nickname Pollaiuolo or Pollaiolo ("Hen-House Keeper" in Italian, from ).

Simone was later given his nickname Il Cronaca. The reason for such nickname has much to do with his style and is explained by Giorgio Vasari. In order to learn more of the architectural art, he marched to Rome around 1470 to observe the old ruins. On his return to Florence he made very meticulous and reasoned stories and descriptions of his observations, which were described like a chronicle.

Pollaiolo was responsible for the completion of Strozzi Palace after the death of Benedetto da Maiano in 1497. He died in Florence in 1508.

Further reading
Anne-Imelda Radice, "Il Cronaca: A Fifteenth-Century Florentine Architect," Ph.D. dissertation, University of North Carolina at Chapel Hill, 1976

References

1457 births
1508 deaths
Architects from Florence
15th-century Italian architects